"Weeeeee" is a song by American rapper Trippie Redd from his third studio album Pegasus. It was released on October 30, 2020. The song produced by Loaded. It went viral on TikTok and peaked at number 80 on the Billboard Hot 100.

Background
The track was first teased on June 25, 2020, in a now-deleted Instagram post, with Trippie hinting at its possible presence on Trippie’s long-awaited album Pegasus. “Weeeeee” later stood out as the album’s best-performing song in the days following its release.

Music video
The music video was released on November 13, 2020, and was directed by Aidan Cullen and Jimmy Regular.

Credits and personnel
 Trippie Redd – vocals, songwriting
 Loaded – production, songwriting
 LenoxBeatmaker - production
 Igor Mamet – mastering, mixing, recording
 Dylan Del-Olmo - mixing

Charts

Certifications

References

2020 songs
Trippie Redd songs
Songs written by Trippie Redd